Saccharoturris monocingulata is a species of sea snail, a marine gastropod mollusk in the family Mangeliidae.

Description
The length of the shell attains 6.8 mm.

(Original description) This species differs from Glyphoturris diminuta by having one more rib (nine in all) and in having the basal cingulum obsolete so that the prominence of the posterior nearly peripheral angulation though not enlarged is much more apparent. This is shown in the figure. Another specimen shows a further modification, in which the number of primary spirals is diminished, and those that are left are less prominent, thus making the whorls appear more rounded. Both of the specimens figured are not quite adult, and hence do not show the aperture fully formed.

Distribution
This marine species occurs off Western Florida, USA; off Barbados and off Mexico; in the Antilles off Guadeloupe

References

 Rosenberg, G., F. Moretzsohn, and E. F. García. 2009. Gastropoda (Mollusca) of the Gulf of Mexico, Pp. 579–699 in Felder, D.L. and D.K. Camp (eds.), Gulf of Mexico–Origins, Waters, and Biota. Biodiversity. Texas A&M Press, College Station, Texas

External links
 
 Gastropods.com:Glyphoturris quadrata quadrata monocingulata (var.)

monocingulata
Gastropods described in 1889